The Burmese–Siamese War (1785–1786), known as the Nine Armies' Wars in Siamese history because the Burmese came in nine armies, was the first war between the Konbaung dynasty of Burma and the Siamese Rattanakosin Kingdom of the Chakri dynasty.

King Bodawpaya of Burma pursued an ambitious campaign to expand his dominions into Siam. In 1785, three years after the foundation of Bangkok as the new royal seat and the Chakri dynasty, King Bodawpaya of Burma marched massive armies with total number of 144,000 to invade Siam in nine armies through five directions including Kanchanaburi, Ratchaburi, Lanna, Tak, Thalang (Phuket), and the southern Malay Peninsula. However, the overstretched armies and provision shortages deemed the Burmese campaign failed. The Siamese under King Rama I and his younger brother Prince Maha Sura Singhanat successfully warded off Burmese invasions. By early 1786, the Burmese had largely retreated.

After the truce during the rainy season, King Bodawpaya resumed his campaign in late 1786. King Bodawpaya sent his son Prince Thado Minsaw to concentrate his forces on Kanchanaburi in only a single direction to invade Siam. The Siamese met the Burmese at Tha Dindaeng, hence the term "Tha Dindaeng Campaign". The Burmese were again defeated and Siam managed to defend its western border. These two failed invasions ultimately turned out to be the last full-scale invasion of Siam by Burma.

Background
Traditional rivalries and dispute over Mon rebels and the Tenasserim coast led to the Burmese-Siamese wars in the eighteenth century. In 1767, the Burmese of the newly founded Konbaung dynasty invaded and destroyed the Ayutthaya Kingdom. King Taksin of Thonburi reunited Siam in the aftermath of the destruction of the Ayutthaya government and capital. In 1774, most of the Lanna Kingdom, which had been under the Burmese rule for about 250 years, came under Siamese domination with exception of Chiang Saen still under Burmese rule. During the Burmese-Siamese War (1775-76), Siam nearly succumbed to the Burmese forces led by General Maha Thiha Thura and Siam's manpower was depleted.

In 1782, Chao Phraya Chakri was crowned as the King Rama I of Siam and founded the Chakri dynasty. In the same year, Prince Badon Min dethroned King Phaungkaza Maung Maung and crowned himself as King Bodawpaya. King Bodawpaya began his reign with glorious military conquests. In 1784, he sent his son Prince Thado Minsaw to successfully conquer the Kingdom of Mrauk U or the Arakan Kingdom. After Arakan, King Bodawpaya turned his eyes on Siam as his next military expedition.

Nine Armies War (July 1785 – March 1786)

Burmese preparations
King Bodawpaya began his Siamese expeditions in July 1785. The Burmese forces were drafted from its various tributary states, most notably the northern Shan states of Hsenwi, Mongnai, Kengtung, Banmaw, Mongkawng and Hsipaw. Bodawpaya first sent Mingyi Mingaung Kyaw to lead an army of 10,000 men to Martaban to arrange the provisions and supplies for the massive royal army and for the fleets at Mergui. However, supply shortage and line communications were the main issue for the Burmese armies. The Burmese were unable to quickly move the large number of men and provisions in time.

King Bodawpaya and his armies left Ava on November 11, 1785. When the king arrived at Martaban on December 20, he found that the supplies did not meet the demands. He ordered Mingyi Mingaung Kyaw arrested from Mergui to be brought to him in chains. After waiting for four days at Martaban, King Bodawpaya was furious that the transportation of men, horses and elephants across the Salween River was delayed and had not been completed. He struck a spear at one of his generals, wounding him. Only with the beseeching of the governor of Kawthanti that the royal temper was cooled down. After staying in Martaban for a month, King Hsinbyushin and his royal forces left Martaban on January 19, 1786, towards the Three Pagodas Pass.

Siamese preparations 
In November 1785, three Burmese men were captured by the Karens of Kyaukkaung. The captured Burmese revealed to Siamese authorities that King Bodawpaya was planning a massive invasion of Siam in multiple directions. King Rama I convened a council of royal princes and ministers to discuss the situation. The Siamese then sent a Burmese man named Nga Gan, who was a former retainer of King Bodawpaya captured by the Siamese, to negotiate with King Bodawpaya at the Three Pagodas. King Bodawpaya, however, was not interested in peace-making and instead inquired Nga Gan about Siamese preparations. The Bangkok court then sent warnings to various cities in Northern and Southern Siam about the impending invasions.

Nine Armies War: Order of battle

From Martaban, Bodawpaya marched his armies through the Three Pagodas Pass. He ordered fourth and fifth divisions to enter through the Three Pagodas first into Kanchanaburi, followed by sixth and seventh divisions of his two sons and then the king's own army settled in Ranti (Alante) River. The vanguard of Minhla Kyawdin and Mingyi Maha Mingaung headed for the old city of Kanchanaburi (known today as "Latya", about fifteen kilometers to the northwest of modern city of Kanchanaburi), while the two princes stationed at Tha Dindaeng and Samsop in modern Sangkhlaburi District.

Kanchanaburi Front

Prelude 
Due to a lack of supplies, Bodawpaya couldn't commit all his forces, numbering 88,000 men, present at the Kanchanaburi Front. He was only able to send the 4th Division with 10,000 men under Minhla Kyawdin and the 5th Division with 5,000 men under Mingyi Maha Mingaung.

Prince Maha Sura Singhanat with 30,000 men marched from Bangkok in December 1785 along with his generals and retinue, reaching Lat Ya (called Kanpuri in Burmese) in Kanchanaburi. He sent the Mon general Phraya Mahayotha or Binnya Sein to intercept the Burmese at Kram Chang (in modern Si Sawat District).

The vanguard Burmese armies of Minhla Kyawdin and Mingyi Maha Mingaung, numbered 15,000 combined, marched through Sai Yok and crossed from Khwae Noi River to Khwae Yai River, meeting Binnya Sein at Si Sawat. Binnya Sein was defeated and the Burmese continued to Latya at the foothills of Khao Chon Kai. They later set up camps. The Siamese army soon arrived and the Battle of Latya ensued.

Battle of Thung Lat Ya 
Maha Sura Singhanat sent a Siamese army to attack the Burmese, but the Burmese were able to repel the Siamese attack. Both sides started building towers to place cannons on top to bomb each other. Both sides suffered heavy losses. To dissuade the Siamese soldiers from retreating, Maha Sura Singhanat built 3 large mortars and announce that if anyone retreats, they will be crushed by them.

Prince Maha Sura Singhanat noticed the Burmese supply lines were thin so he sent 500 men under the command of Phraya Siharatdecho, Phraya Tai Nam, and Phraya Phetchaburi to go ambush the Burmese supply lines at Phu Krai Sub-district. These men were too afraid to attack the Burmese army so they hid. They were later caught and beheaded. Maha Sura Singhanat then sent a force of 1,500 men under Khun Noen to ambush the Burmese supply lines. This devastated the Burmese supply lines.

A stalemate 
The battle reached stalemate and was dragged on to January 1786. Being afraid that his brother would lose the engagement, King Rama I decided to march his 20,000-men army from Bangkok in January 1786 to support Maha Sura Singhanat Lat Ya, but the prince then convinced the king to return to Bangkok because he was confident of winning the engagement.

Breaking the stalemate 
The Burmese side, upon observing the royal army arriving from Bangkok, believed that the Siamese was being reinforced. Prince Maha Sura Singhanat then had his army secretly march out of Lat Ya at night and march into Lat Ya again in the day, tricking the Burmese into believing that the Siamese was reinforced. With supply lines disrupted, the Burmese at Lat Ya were starved and deprived of morale. The Burmese killed horses for meat and dug for plant roots to eat. On 18 February 1786, the Siamese staged the all-out attack against the Burmese lines. Minhla Kyawdin and Mingyi Maha Mingaung the Burmese generals, unable to withstand Siamese attacks anymore, retreat. King Hsinbyushin decided to give up the campaigns and ordered the general retreat of the Burmese armies on February 21, 1786.

Aftermath 
After two months of battle, the Siamese were able to repel the Burmese invasion at Lat Ya. Prince Maha Sura Singhanat ordered the Siamese to follow the retreating Burmese as far as Sangkhlaburi where the armies of the two Burmese princes were stationed. Prince Thiri Damayaza and Prince Thado Minsaw reported to King Bodawpaya at Ranti River about the defeat. King Bodawpaya then ordered the general retreat. A large number of Burmese were captured as prisoners. Thai sources mentioned that the Burmese suffered around 6,000 casualties as a result of the battle.

Ratchaburi Front

Prelude 
Nemyo Nawratha divided his 10,000-men army into 3 groups. Nemyo Nawratha himself led an army of 4,000 men through the Bong Ti Pass (in modern Sai Yok District, Kanchanaburi Province) and stationed at Chom Bueng. Nemyo Nawratha also sent his subordinate Dawei Wun to lead an army of 3,000 men to enter Ratchaburi through Suan Phueng. Dawei Wun and his army stayed at Khao Ngu, just five kilometers to the northwest of the town of Ratchaburi itself. They sustained themselves by harvesting coconuts and other fruits in the region. The remaining 3,000 troops were sent to join the 1st Division under Maha Thiri Thihathu at Myeik. Chao Phraya Thamma Boonrot, who led the Siamese army of 5,000 men in Ratchaburi town, was still unaware of these Burmese advances.

Battle of Khao Ngu 
After defeating the Burmese at Lat Ya in February 1786, Prince Maha Sura Singhanat then marched to Ratchaburi. He sent his two generals Phraya Kalahom Ratchasena and Phraya Chasaenyakorn ahead as vanguard. The two generals met the Burmese at Khao Ngu and defeated Dawei Wun and the Burmese army in the Battle of Khao Ngu. Dawei Wun retreated towards Suan Phueng and was followed by the Siamese. Nemyo Nawratha at Chom Bueng, upon seeing the defeat of Dawei Wun at Khao Ngu, also decided to retreat as soon as he had received orders from King Bodawpaya.

Aftermath 
Prince Maha Sura Singhanat was angry that the Siamese general Chao Phraya Thamma Boonrot had allowed the Burmese to penetrate so deep into Ratchaburi. The prince petitioned King Rama I for Thamma Boonrot to be executed. However, as Thamma Boonrot had been a supporter in his ascension, King Rama I ordered his life to be spared. Thamma Boonrot was then whipped and paraded through the camps in shame with his head shaved. He was also stripped of his title and position as the Minister of Palatial Affairs.

Northern Front

Siege of Lampang 
Prince Thado Thiri Maha Uzana ventured to recruit men from the Shan States and marched the Burmese army of 30,000 men to Chiang Saen. The Burmese governor of Chiang Saen called Aprakamani also provided resources. As Chiang Mai had been abandoned since 1776, the main outpost of the Lanna Kingdom against the Burmese was Lampang. Prince Thado Thiri Maha Uzana and Aprakamani marched from Chiang Saen to attack Lampang in December 1785, leading to the Siege of Lampang. Prince Kawila, the ruler of Lampang, defended the city.

Preludes to the Battle of Pakphing 
Prince Thado Thiri Maha Uzana also sent his Sitke, Nemyo Sithu, to lead an army of 3,000 from Lampang down south towards the Upper Chao Phraya Plains. The governors of Sawankhalok, Sukhothai and Phitsanulok, due to manpower shortages, decided to abandon their cities and flee into the jungles as they were unable to raise armies against the Burmese. Nemyo Sithu marched through these cities unopposed and stationed his camps at Pakping, twenty kilometers to the south of the city of Phitsanulok. The 9th Division of Nawratha Kyawgaung also entered the Chao Phraya Plains from the west through Rahaeng or modern Tak. The governor of Tak surrendered and was captured to Burma.

Battle of Pakphing 

Prince Anurak Devesh marched his army of 15,000 men from Bangkok to encamp at Nakhon Sawan. He sent Chao Phraya Mahasena Pli to Phichit just south of Pakphing to face Nemyo Sithu. The Siamese army of Prince Anurak Devesh in Upper Chao Phraya Plains was at risk of being attacked from two directions; from Pakphing by Nemyo Sithu in the north and from Tak by Nawratha Kyawgaung from the west. Prince Anurak Devesh ordered Phraya Phraklang Hon to stay at Chai Nat to defend the rear lines against possible Burmese attacks from Tak. However, as both the Burmese and Siamese took their positions, neither sides engaged.

Prince Maha Sura Singhanat and his generals returned from Ratchaburi to Bangkok in March 1786. King Rama I and Prince Maha Sura Singhanat devised the second-phase plan, in which King Rama I would lead armies to the north and Prince Maha Sura Singhanat to the south. King Rama I sent message to his nephew Prince Anurak Devesh at Nakhon Sawan, urging him to initiate the attacks against the Burmese. King Rama I marched the royal army of 30,000 men to Phichit to supervise campaigns in the northern theater, leaving Bangkok on March 10, 1786. As the king went to Phichit, Prince Anurak Devesh also moved to Phichit. King Rama I ordered another nephew Prince Thepharirak and Phraklang Hon at Chai Nat to march against Nawratha Kyawgaung at Tak. Prince Anurak Devesh and Mahasena Pli at Phichit eventually engaged with Nemyo Sithu at Pakphing, leading to the Battle of Pakphing on 18 March 1786. The Burmese were defeated and Nemyo Sithu withdrew westward. The Burmese fled to the west crossing the Nan River where they were massacred by the pursuing Siamese and the bodies filled the river.

Relieving the Siege of Lampang 
After the Battle of Pakping, King Rama I ordered Chao Phraya Mahasena Pli, together with the king's half younger brother Prince Chakchetsada, to lead the Siamese army to the north to relieve the Siege of Lampang. When Prince Thepharirak sent Phraklang Hon had reached Kamphaeng Phet, however, Nawratha Kyawgaung at Tak retreated after the Burmese defeat at Pakping and the engagements did not occur. As both the Burmese of the north and west had retreated, the king and Prince Anurak Devesh returned to Bangkok.

Prince Kawila of Lampang had held out the town against the Burmese siege for four months. Mahasena Pli and Prince Chakchetsada reached Lampang in March 1786. The Siamese attacked the besieging Burmese at the rear and the Burmese Prince Thado Thiri Maha Uzana withdrew to Chiang Saen. Lampang was finally relieved from the Burmese siege. The Siamese was then able to repel the Burmese invasions in the Northern Theater.

Thalang Front
As the Siamese forces were concentrated on Western and Northern Fronts, the Southern Siamese cities were defenseless due to the lack of manpower and their governors were left on their own against the Burmese invasion. The Burmese general Maha Thiri Thihathu ("Kinwun Mingyi" in Thai sources) sailed the massive fleet of 10,000 men from Mergui to the Siamese Andaman Coast in December 1785. Maha Thiri Thihathu divided his armies in two routes; he sent Wungyi to lead a fleet of 3,000 men southward to attack Phuket, while himself led the rest of the army eastward across the Malay Peninsula to ravage the coast of Gulf of Siam.

Siege of Thalang

Background 
The modern city of Phuket had not yet been founded (which was founded in 1827). The largest settlement on the Phuket Island back then was then the town of Thalang in the northern part of the island (in modern Thalang District). The governor of Thalang had just died from illness. Lady Chan, wife of the late governor of Thalang, was being imprisoned at Phang Nga for some charges.

Siege of Thalang

Wungyi the Burmese general quickly attacked and took the towns of Takua Pa and Takua Thung on the Andaman Coast. When the Burmese sacked Phang Nga, Lady Chan escaped and returned to Thalang. As Thalang was left with no governor, Chan and her sister Lady Muk, together with her son Thien and her cousin Thongpun the vice-governor, organized the local defense against the Burmese invasion. They established themselves at Phra Nang Sang Temple and Thung Nang Dak and managed to be armed with two great canons. Francis Light, a British merchant also supported the Thalang defenders with arquebuses. The Burmese general Wungyi led the assault on Thalang in February 1786. The defenders relied on their heavy canons to ward off the Burmese invaders. After about one month of continuous fighting, the Burmese finally retreated on March 13, 1786. Today, Lady Chan and Lady Mook are revered as national heroines.

Southern Thailand Front

Prelude 
Maha Thiri Thihathu sailed his 7,000-men fleet to disembark at Ranong, continuing to Kraburi and crossing the Tenasserim Hills at Pakchan to attack Chumphon. Maha Thiri Thihathu sent his Sitke-gyi Nemyo Gonnarat with 2,500 men ahead as vanguard. The governors of Chumphon and Chaiya decided to abandon their towns in the face of Burmese invasion due to manpower shortage. Maha Thiri Thihathu and Nemyo Gonnarat sacked both towns and continued southward to Nakhon Si Thammarat (Ligor). Chaophraya Nakhon Phat the governor of Nakhon Si Thammarat managed to raise an army of 1,000 men to march against the Burmese at the Tapi River in modern Phunphin District. Maha Thiri Thihathu, however, had a Siamese man from Chaiya to yell at the Ligorian army that Bangkok had already fallen to the Burmese. Chao Phraya Nakhon Phat was convinced that Bangkok had fallen because by then no reinforcements had arrived from Bangkok. Nakhon Phat decided to abandon the city of Ligor and, with his family, escaped to Khao Luang – a mountain to the west of Ligor. The inhabitants of Ligor also fled into the jungles as resistance against the Burmese collapsed. Maha Thiri Thihathu took Nakhon Si Thammarat with ease, plundering the city and enslaving the native Siamese.

After taking three consecutive towns on the coast of Gulf of Siam, Maha Thiri Thihathu headed for Phatthalung next. The inhabitants of Phatthalung, upon seeing the fate of their compatriots to the north, also fled the town. A local monk named Chuai encouraged the inhabitants of Phatthalung to fight against the Burmese. Chuai the monk managed to raise an army of 1,000 men and, with himself riding on a palanquin, marched against the Burmese at Cha-uat. However, the Burmese retreated before the engagements begun because the Bangkokian army was attacking from the north.

Battle of Chaiya 
Prince Maha Sura Singhanat sailed his fleet of 20,000 men from Bangkok to the south, departing on March 4, 1786. The prince reached Chumphon and ordered his generals Phraya Kalahom Ratchasena and Phraya Chasaenyakorn to lead the vanguard to Chaiya. Maha Thiri Thihathu also sent Sitke-gyi Nemyo Gonnarat to Chaiya. Both sides engaged in the Battle of Chaiya. The Siamese was able to encircle the Burmese but the heavy rainfall neutralized most of the Siamese canons. Nemyo Gonnarat managed to break through the encirclement and fled westward and was closely pursued by the two Siamese generals. Many Burmese were captured as war prisoners and were brought to the prince at Chumphon. Burmese general Maha Thiri Thihathu at Ligor, upon seeing the defeat of his subordinate at Chaiya, decided to lead the Burmese to retreat westward through Krabi and back to Mergui. Prince Maha Sura Singhanat then marched to reclaim the city of Nakhon Si Thammarat.

Prince Maha Sura Singhanat ordered Chao Phraya Nakhon Phat to be brought to him for the crime of cowardice. However, Nakhon Phat was pardoned due to the inevitability of his situation and was assigned to restore the city. As the lasts of the Burmese were expelled from Southern Siam, the Nine Armies' War came to the end.

Conclusion
King Bodawpaya of Burma attempted to inflict the pincer attack from many directions on Central Siam and Bangkok. However, his many armies were expected to conjoin but failed to cooperate. The lack of provision supplies was the major disadvantage on the Burmese side, as the Burmese troops were starved at Kanchanaburi. The Siamese also adopted less defensive strategy than the previous wars. Siamese forces were sent to deal with the Burmese at the borders instead of locking themselves in fortifications and allowing the Burmese to penetrate. Despite being inferior in numbers, the Siamese were able to fend off the Burmese invasions.

After the war, King Rama I awarded and promoted those who made contributions. His nephew Prince Anurak Devesh was awarded with the title Krom Phra Ratchawang Lang or the Prince of the Rear Palace. Lady Chan and Lady Muk, the heroines of Thalang, were given titles Thao Thep Krasattri and Thao Si Sunthon respectively. Chuai the monk who led the resistance against the Burmese at Phatthalung was made Phraya Tukkaraj the vice-governor of Phatthalung.

Tha Din Daeng campaign

After the truce during the rainy season, King Bodawpaya resumed his campaign in late 1786. King Bodawpaya sent his son Prince Thado Minsaw to concentrate his forces on Kanchanaburi in only a single direction to invade Siam. The Siamese met the Burmese at Tha Dindaeng, hence the term "Tha Dindaeng Campaign". The Burmese were again defeated and Siam managed to defend its western border.

Prelude
After many defeats in early 1786, King Bodawpaya retreated to Martaban. However, he retained some of his forces on the Tenasserim Coast waiting for the new campaigns. The traditional wars were usually conducted in dry season as in the rainy seasons the lands were swampy and ravaged with diseases, unsuitable for marching and encampment. King Bodawpaya ordered the Burmese forces at Tavoy to retreat to Martaban under the command of Minhla Kyawdin, while Maha Thiri Thihathu was ordered to retreat from Mergui to Tavoy. The king then marched back to Dagon where he worshipped the famous Shwedagon Pagoda and returned to Ava. The Burmese armies stationed at Martanban and Tavoy, waiting for the rainy season to be over to conduct new invasions of Siam.

In September 1786, King Bodawpaya resumed his Siamese campaigns. He sent his eldest son and heir, Prince Thado Minsaw or Prince Nanda Kyawdin (known in Thai sources as Einshe Maha Uparaja) to Martaban to organize the new invasion of Siam.

Preparations

Prince Nanda Kyawdin or Einshe Uparaja took the lead of the army of 50,000 men at Martaban, with Wundauk Nemyo Kyawzwa as his Sitke and Mingyi Nanda Kyawdin as Bogyok. King Bodawpaya made sure that the provision shortage would not hinder the campaign again. He ordered the grain rations of Arakan and the whole Lower Burma to be sent to the frontlines. The Burmese also established strong supply lines with supply outposts stationed all along the way from Martaban to Kanchanaburi. Unlike the previous invasion, the Burmese concentrate the forces in single direction at Kanchanaburi instead of dispersing the forces in many directions. Prince Nanda Kyawdin sent Minhla Kyawdin, the Burmese veteran who had been defeated by the Siamese at the Battle of Latya seven months earlier, to lead the vanguard of 30,000 ahead into Kanchanaburi. The two Burmese vanguard commanders left Ava for Martaban on September 7, 1786.

Emboldened by their successes earlier in the year, the Siamese were much more confident in their responses to the Burmese invasion. Both King Rama I and his brother Prince Maha Sura Singhanat marched to meet the Burmese at Kanchanaburi.
Prince Maha Sura Singhanat, along with his two generals Phraya Kalahom Ratchasena and Phraya Chasaenyakorn and Chao Phraya Rattanapipit the Samuha Nayok, marched ahead the army of 30,000 men.
King Rama I himself and his nephew Prince Anurak Devesh of the Rear Palace led the royal army of 30,000 men.
The Siamese royal forces left Bangkok on February 1, 1787, for Kanchanaburi to the west to face the invading Burmese.

The Battle (February 1787) 
The Burmese armies entered Kanchaburi through the Three Padodas Pass or Payathonzu. Minha Sithu divided his forces to station at Tha Dindaeng and Samsop, both in Sangkhlaburi, Kanchanaburi. Prince Nanda Kyawdin stayed at the Three Padogas. Prince Maha Sura Singhanat marched to Sai Yok in Kanchaburi and encamped. He ordered his generals Phraya Kalahom Ratchasena and Phraya Chasaenyakorn to march ahead as vanguard to Sangkhlaburi. When King Rama I had reached Sai Yok, Prince Maha Sura Singhanat moved to Sangkhlaburi. The Siamese armies concealed their movements in the jungles to stage the surprise attack on the Burmese.

After long marches, the two sides finally met at Tha Dindaeng and Samsop on 21 February 1787. The fighting lasted for two days until Minhla Kyawdin was quickly defeated, again for the second time, on February 23. This short war was called “Tha Din Daeng campaign”. Minhla Kyawdin retreated back to Payathonzu. Prince Nanda Kyawdin, upon seeing the defeat of Minhla Kyawdin, also retreated back to Martaban. The Siamese forces burnt all the Burmese grain supplies in Kanchanaburi

The campaign is commemorated by a park established by the Royal Thai Army  from the town of Kanchanaburi.

Aftermath 
Despite the continuation of heated conflict between Burma and Siam in the next decades, including several Siamese attempts to recapture the Tenasserim Coast and a failed 1809 Burmese invasion to seize Thalang (renamed Phuket) Island and to contest Siamese control over the central peninsula, Bodawpaya's two failed invasions ultimately turned out to be the last two full-scale attempts by Burma to invade central Siam and to destroy Siam as a political entity.

See also
 Burmese–Siamese wars
 Burma–Thailand relations

References

Conflicts in 1785
Conflicts in 1786
1780s in Siam
18th century in Burma
Konbaung dynasty
Wars involving the Rattanakosin Kingdom
Burmese–Siamese wars
1785 in Asia
1786 in Asia
1780s in Asia
1780s in Burma